Bumper or Bumpers may refer to:

People
 Betty Bumpers (1925-2018), American activist, First Lady of Arkansas, wife of Dale Bumpers 
 Dale Bumpers (1925–2016), American politician, governor of Arkansas and senator
 Bumper Robinson (born 1974), American actor and voice actor
 Bumper Tormohlen (1937–2018), American National Basketball Association player and coach

Arts and entertainment
 Bumpers (album), a rock music sampler by Island Records
 "Bumper", a song by Julio Voltio
 Bumper (broadcasting), a short transitional segment
 Bumper, a type of obstacle in pinball
 Hit and Run (2009 film), a horror film also known as Bumper
 Bumper, a bulldog in the American comic strip The Middletons
 Bumper the Badger, a character in the video game Diddy Kong Racing

Technology and transportation
 Bumper (car), a part for absorbing impact
 Buffer stop or bumper, a stopping device on railroads
 RTV-G-4 Bumper, an American sounding rocket

Other uses
 , a US Navy submarine
 Two game fish in the family Carangidae:
 Atlantic bumper (Chloroscombrus chrysurus)
 Pacific bumper (Chloroscombrus orqueta) 
 Bumper race, a type of horse race
 Crib bumper, a cushion in an infant bed
 Bumper knot, used in fishing to secure bait
 Automatic watch#Bumper, an early type of self-winding mechanism in automatic watches

See also
 Bumper v. North Carolina, a US Supreme Court case decided in 1968
 Bumper crop, a crop that has yielded an unusually productive harvest
 BMPER, a human protein
 Bump (disambiguation)
 
 

Lists of people by nickname